Vijay Bansal is an Indian politician from the Bharatiya Janata Party and a member of the Rajasthan Legislative Assembly representing the Bharatpur Vidhan Sabha constituency of Rajasthan.

References 

Rajasthani politicians
Bharatiya Janata Party politicians from Rajasthan
People from Bharatpur, Rajasthan
Year of birth missing (living people)
Living people